All Saints Church, Wandsworth, is a Grade II* listed church in Wandsworth High Street, London. It is a Church of England parish church, and the original parish church of Wandsworth.

Origins
There has been a church on the site since at least 1234, when John de Panormo was granted a dispensation 'to hold the Church of Wandsworth' as well as one in Italy.

The present building
The present church originates from 1630. However, only the tower actually dates from this period; the north aisle was built in 1716, while most of the remainder dates from the rebuilding of 1780. Further alterations and additions were made in the 19th century; these included the strengthening of the tower in 1841 to accommodate a new set of bells, and a new chancel by E. W. Mountford, completed in 1900.

Today, All Saints shares its parish with the nearby church of Holy Trinity.

Interior
The interior has Robert Adam-like columns of wood, painted as marble, with a frieze and enriched cornice. Some monuments from the original church still survive in the present building; these include a brass to a soldier of King Henry V, and monuments to Susannah Powell (1620) and Alderman Henry Smith (1627).

Gallery

References

External links

1630 establishments in England
17th-century Church of England church buildings
Wandsworth
Wandsworth
Churches completed in 1630
Wandsworth
Grade II* listed buildings in the London Borough of Wandsworth
Grade II* listed churches in London
Rebuilt churches in the United Kingdom